The Unknown Alabama Confederate Soldiers Monument is an outdoor stone marker and memorial installed 3 miles north of Brantley, Alabama, in a privately owned Confederate Veterans Memorial Park. The monument reads:
Unknown AL Soldier
C.S.A.
"Mother, I have 
been found.
I am home."

"It sits among existing monuments, replica cannons and tall flagpoles flying Confederate and other flags." More than 500 people attended the monument's dedication in 2017. Another source gives the number as 200.

See also

 List of Confederate monuments and memorials

References

2017 establishments in Alabama
2017 sculptures
Buildings and structures in Crenshaw County, Alabama
Confederate States of America monuments and memorials in Alabama
Outdoor sculptures in Alabama
Stone sculptures in the United States